Alonzo Breitenstein (November 9, 1857 – June 19, 1932) was a National League pitcher. Breitenstein played for the Philadelphia Quakers in the  season. In one career game, he had a 0–1 record with a 9.00 ERA. Breitenstein allowed nine runs on eight hits, in 5.0 innings pitched. With what hand he batted and threw is unknown.

Life
Alonzo Breitenstein was born on November 9, 1857, in Utica, New York. He died on June 19, 1932, in Utica. He was buried at Forest Hill Cemetery in Utica.

References

External links

 

1857 births
1932 deaths
Philadelphia Quakers players
Major League Baseball pitchers
Baseball players from New York (state)
Binghamton Bingoes players
Elmira Colonels players
Utica Pent Ups players
19th-century baseball players
Sportspeople from Utica, New York
Burials at Forest Hill Cemetery (Utica, New York)